Burr Oak is an unincorporated community in Union Township, Marshall County, Indiana.

Burr Oak was platted in 1882.

Geography

References

Unincorporated communities in Marshall County, Indiana
Unincorporated communities in Indiana